TikTok, and its Chinese counterpart Douyin, is a short-form video hosting service owned by the Chinese company ByteDance. It hosts user-submitted videos, which can range in duration from 3 seconds to 10 minutes.

Since their launches, TikTok and Douyin have gained global popularity. In October 2020, TikTok surpassed 2 billion mobile downloads worldwide. Morning Consult named TikTok the third-fastest growing brand of 2020, after Zoom and Peacock. Cloudflare ranked TikTok the most popular website of 2021, surpassing google.com.

TikTok has been subject to criticism over psychological effects such as addiction, as well as controversies regarding inappropriate content, misinformation, censorship, moderation, and user privacy.

Douyin 
Douyin was launched by ByteDance in Beijing, China in September 2016, originally under the name A.me, before rebranding to Douyin in December 2016.

TikTok vs. Douyin 
TikTok is an entirely separate, internationalized version of Douyin, which was released in the Chinese market in September 2016. It launched in 2017 for iOS and Android in most markets outside of mainland China; however, it became available worldwide only after merging with another Chinese social media service, Musical.ly, on 2 August 2018.

TikTok and Douyin have almost the same user interface but no access to each other's content. Their servers are each based in the market where the respective app is available. The two products are similar, but their features are not identical. Douyin includes an in-video search feature that can search by people's faces for more videos of them, along with other features such as buying, booking hotels, and making geo-tagged reviews.

History

Evolution 
ByteDance planned on Douyin expanding overseas. The founder of ByteDance, Zhang Yiming, stated that "China is home to only one-fifth of Internet users globally. If we don’t expand on a global scale, we are bound to lose to peers eyeing the four-fifths. So, going global is a must." Douyin was developed in 200 days and within a year had 100 million users, with more than one billion videos viewed every day.

The app was launched as TikTok in the international market in September 2017. On 23 January 2018, the TikTok app ranked first among free application downloads on app stores in Thailand and other countries.

TikTok has been downloaded more than 130 million times in the United States and has reached 2 billion downloads worldwide, according to data from mobile research firm Sensor Tower (those numbers exclude Android users in China).

In the United States, celebrities, including Jimmy Fallon and Tony Hawk, began using the app in 2018. Other celebrities, including Jennifer Lopez, Jessica Alba, Will Smith, and Justin Bieber joined TikTok as well as many others.

In January 2019, TikTok allowed creators to embed merchandise sale links into their videos.

On 3 September 2019, TikTok and the U.S. National Football League (NFL) announced a multi-year partnership. The agreement occurred just two days before the NFL's 100th season kick-off at Soldier Field, where TikTok hosted activities for fans in honor of the deal. The partnership entails the launch of an official NFL TikTok account, which is to bring about new marketing opportunities such as sponsored videos and hashtag challenges. In July 2020, TikTok, excluding Douyin, reported close to 800 million monthly active users worldwide after less than four years of existence.

In May 2021, TikTok appointed Shou Zi Chew as their new CEO who assumed the position from interim CEO Vanessa Pappas, following the resignation of Kevin A. Mayer on 27 August 2020. On 3 August 2020, U.S. President Donald Trump threatened to ban TikTok in the United States on 15 September if negotiations for the company to be bought by Microsoft or a different American company failed. On 6 August, Trump signed two executive orders banning U.S. "transactions" with TikTok and WeChat to its respective parent companies ByteDance and Tencent, set to take effect 45 days after the signing. A planned ban of the app on 20 September 2020 was postponed by a week and then blocked by a federal judge. President Biden revoked the ban in a new executive order in June 2021. The app has been banned by the government of India since June 2020 along with 223 other Chinese apps in view of privacy concerns. Pakistan banned TikTok citing "immoral" and "indecent" videos on 9 October 2020 but reversed its ban ten days later. In March 2021, a Pakistani court ordered a new TikTok ban due to complaints over "indecent" content.

In September 2021, TikTok reported that it had reached 1 billion users. In 2021, TikTok earned $4 billion in advertising revenue.

In October 2022, TikTok was reported to be planning an expansion into the e-commerce market in the US, following the launch of TikTok Shop in the United Kingdom. The company posted job listings for staff for a series of order fulfillment centers in the US and is reportedly planning to start the new live shopping business before the end of the year.

Musical.ly merger 

On 9 November 2017, TikTok's parent company, ByteDance, spent nearly $1 billion to purchase musical.ly, a startup headquartered in Shanghai with an overseas office in Santa Monica, California, U.S. Musical.ly was a social media video platform that allowed users to create short lip-sync and comedy videos, initially released in August 2014. TikTok merged with musical.ly on 2 August 2018 with existing accounts and data consolidated into one app, keeping the title TikTok. This ended musical.ly and made TikTok a worldwide app, excluding China, since China already had Douyin.

Expansion in other markets 
As of 2018, TikTok was available in more than 150 markets, and in 75 languages. TikTok was downloaded more than 104 million times on Apple's App Store during the first half of 2018, according to data provided to CNBC by Sensor Tower.

After merging with musical.ly in August, downloads increased and TikTok became the most downloaded app in the U.S. in October 2018, which musical.ly had done once before. In February 2019, TikTok, together with Douyin, hit one billion downloads globally, excluding Android installs in China. In 2019, media outlets cited TikTok as the 7th-most-downloaded mobile app of the decade, from 2010 to 2019. It was also the most-downloaded app on Apple's App Store in 2018 and 2019, surpassing Facebook, YouTube and Instagram. In September 2020, a deal was confirmed between ByteDance and Oracle in which the latter will serve as a partner to provide cloud hosting. Walmart intends to invest in TikTok. This deal would stall in 2021 as newly elected President Biden's Justice Department put a hold on the previous U.S. ban under President Trump. In November 2020, TikTok signed a licensing deal with Sony Music. In December 2020, Warner Music Group signed a licensing deal with TikTok. In April 2021, Abu Dhabi's Department of Culture and Tourism partnered with TikTok to promote tourism. It came following the January 2021 winter campaign, initiated through a partnership between the UAE Government Media Office partnered and TikTok to promote the country's tourism.

Since 2014, the first non-gaming apps with more than 3 billion downloads were Facebook, WhatsApp, Instagram, and Messenger; all owned by Meta. TikTok was the first non-Facebook app to reach that figure. Sensor Tower reported that although TikTok had been banned in India, its largest market, in June 2020, downloads in the rest of the world continue to increase, reaching 3 billion downloads in 2021.

Features 

The mobile app allows users to create short videos, which often feature music in the background and can be sped up, slowed down, or edited with a filter. They can also add their own sound on top of the background music. To create a music video with the app, users can choose background music from a wide variety of music genres, edit with a filter and record a 15-second video with speed adjustments before uploading it to share with others on TikTok or other social platforms.

The "For You" page on TikTok is a feed of videos that are recommended to users based on their activity on the app. Content is curated by TikTok's artificial intelligence depending on the content a user liked, interacted with, or searched. This is in contrast to other social networks' algorithms basing such content off of the user's relationships with other users and what they liked or interacted with.

The app's "react" feature allows users to film their reaction to a specific video, over which it is placed in a small window that is movable around the screen. Its "duet" feature allows users to film a video aside from another video. The "duet" feature was another trademark of musical.ly. The duet feature is also only able to be used if both parties adjust the privacy settings.

Videos that users do not want to post yet can be stored in their "drafts." The user is allowed to see their "drafts" and post when they find it fitting.
The app allows users to set their accounts as "private." When first downloading the app, the user's account is public by default. The user can change to private in their settings. Private content remains visible to TikTok but is blocked from TikTok users who the account holder has not authorized to view their content. Users can choose whether any other user, or only their "friends," may interact with them through the app via comments, messages, or "react" or "duet" videos. Users also can set specific videos to either "public," "friends only," or "private" regardless if the account is private or not.

Users can also send their friends videos, emojis, and messages with direct messaging. TikTok has also included a feature to create a video based on the user's comments. Influencers often use the "live" feature. This feature is only available for those who have at least 1,000 followers and are over 16 years old. If over 18, the user's followers can send virtual "gifts" that can be later exchanged for money.

TikTok announced a "family safety mode" in February 2020 for parents to be able to control their children's presence on the app. There is a screen time management option, restricted mode, and the option to put a limit on direct messages. The app expanded its parental controls feature called "Family Pairing" in September 2020 to provide parents and guardians with educational resources to understand what children on TikTok are exposed to. Content for the feature was created in partnership with online safety nonprofit, Internet Matters.

In October 2021, TikTok launched a test feature that allows users to directly tip certain creators. Accounts of users that are of age, have at least 100,000 followers and agree to the terms can activate a "Tip" button on their profile, which allows followers to tip any amount, starting from $1.

In December 2021, TikTok started beta-testing Live Studio, a streaming software that would let users broadcast applications open on their computers, including games. The software also launched with support for mobile and PC streaming. However, a few days later, users on Twitter discovered that the software uses code from the open-source OBS Studio. OBS made a statement saying that, under the GNU GPL version 2, TikTok has to make the code of Live Studio publicly available if it wants to use any code from OBS.

In May 2022, TikTok announced TikTok Pulse, an ad revenue-sharing program. It covers the "top 4% of all videos on TikTok" and is only available to creators with more than 100,000 followers. If an eligible creator's video reaches the top 4%, they will receive a 50% share of the revenue from ads displayed with the video.

Content and usage

Demographics 

TikTok tends to appeal to younger users, as 41% of its users are between the ages of 16 and 24. These individuals are considered Generation Z. Among these TikTok users, 90% said they used the app daily. TikTok's geographical use has shown that 43% of new users are from India. As of the first quarter of 2022, there were over 100 million monthly active users in the United States and 23 million in the UK. The average user, daily, was spending 1 hour and 25 minutes on the app and opening TikTok 17 times.

Viral trends 

A variety of trends have risen within TikTok, including memes, lip-synced songs, and comedy videos. Duets, a feature that allows users to add their own video to an existing video with the original content's audio, have sparked many of these trends.

The app has spawned numerous viral trends, Internet celebrities, and music trends around the world. Many stars got their start on musical.ly, which merged with TikTok on 2 August 2018. These include Loren Gray, Baby Ariel, Kristen Hancher, Zach King, Lisa and Lena, Jacob Sartorius, and many others. Loren Gray remained the most-followed individual on TikTok until Charli D’Amelio surpassed her on 25 March 2020. Gray's was the first TikTok account to reach 40 million followers on the platform. She was surpassed with 41.3 million followers. D'Amelio was the first to ever reach 50, 60, and 70 million followers. Charli D’Amelio remained the most-followed individual on the platform until she was surpassed by Khaby Lame on June 23, 2022. Other creators rose to fame after the platform merged with musical.ly on 2 August 2018. TikTok also played a major part in making "Old Town Road" by Lil Nas X one of the biggest songs of 2019 and the longest-running number-one song in the history of the US Billboard Hot 100.

TikTok has allowed many music artists to gain a wider audience, often including foreign fans. For example, despite never having toured in Asia, the band Fitz and the Tantrums developed a large following in South Korea following the widespread popularity of their 2016 song "HandClap" on the platform. "Any Song" by R&B and rap artist Zico became number one on the Korean music charts due to the popularity of the #anysongchallenge, where users dance to the choreography of the song. The platform has also launched many songs that failed to garner initial commercial success into sleeper hits, particularly during the COVID-19 pandemic. However, it has received criticism for not paying royalties to artists whose music is used on the platform.

In June 2020, TikTok users and K-pop fans "claimed to have registered potentially hundreds of thousands of tickets" for President Trump's campaign rally in Tulsa through communication on TikTok, contributing to "rows of empty seats" at the event. Later, in October 2020, an organization called TikTok for Biden was created to support then-presidential candidate Joe Biden. After the election, the organization was renamed to Gen-Z for Change.

TikTok has banned Holocaust denial, but other conspiracy theories have become popular on the platform, such as Pizzagate and QAnon (two conspiracy theories popular among the U.S. alt-right) whose hashtags reached almost 80 million views and 50 million views respectively by June 2020. The platform has also been used to spread misinformation about the COVID-19 pandemic, such as clips from Plandemic. TikTok removed some of these videos and has generally added links to accurate COVID-19 information on videos with tags related to the pandemic.

On 10 August 2020, Emily Jacobssen wrote and sang "Ode To Remy," a song praising the protagonist from Pixar's 2007 computer-animated film named Ratatouille. The song rose to popularity when musician Daniel Mertzlufft composed a backing track to the song. In response, began creating a "crowdsourced" project called Ratatouille The Musical. Since Mertzlufft's video, many new elements including costume design, additional songs, and a playbill have been created. On 1 January 2021, a full one-hour virtual presentation of Ratatouille the Musical premiered on the TodayTix. It starred Titus Burgess as Remy, Wayne Brady as Django, Adam Lambert as Emile, Chamberlin as Gusteau, Andrew Barth Feldman as Linguini, Ashley Park as Colette, Priscilla Lopez as Mabel, Mary Testa as Skinner, and André De Shields as Ego.

Cosmetic surgery trends 

Content promoting cosmetic surgery is popular on TikTok and has spawned several viral trends on the platform. In December 2021, Plastic and Reconstructive Surgery, the journal of the American Society of Plastic Surgeons, published an article about the popularity of some plastic surgeons on TikTok. In the article, it was noted that plastic surgeons were some of the earliest adopters of social media in the medical field and many had been recognised as influencers on the platform. The article published stats about the most popular plastic surgeons on TikTok up to February 2021 and at the time, five different plastic surgeons had surpassed 1 million followers on the platform.

In 2021, it was reported that a trend known as the #NoseJobCheck trend was going viral on TikTok. TikTok content creators used a specific audio on their videos while showing how their noses looked before and after having their rhinoplasty surgeries. By January 2021, the hashtag #nosejob had accumulated 1.6 billion views, #nosejobcheck had accumulated 1 billion views, and the audio used in the #NoseJobCheck trend had been used in 120,000 videos. In 2020, Charli D'Amelio, the most-followed person on TikTok at the time, also made a #NoseJobCheck video to show the results of her surgery to repair her previously broken nose.

In April 2022, NBC News reported that surgeons were giving influencers on the platform discounted or free cosmetic surgeries in order to advertise the procedures to their audiences. They also reported that facilities that offered these surgeries were also posting about them on TikTok. TikTok has banned the advertising of cosmetic surgeries on the platform but cosmetic surgeons are still able to reach large audiences using unpaid photo and video posts. NBC reported that videos using the hashtags '#plasticsurgery' and '#lipfiller' had amassed a combined 26 billion views on the platform.

In December 2022, it was reported that a cosmetic surgery procedure known as buccal fat removal was going viral on the platform. The procedure involves surgically removing fat from the cheeks in order to give the face a slimmer and more chiseled appearance. Videos using hashtags related to buccal fat removal had collectively amassed over 180 million views. Some TikTok users criticised the trend for promoting an unobtainable beauty standard.

Influencer marketing 
TikTok has provided a platform for users to create content not only for fun but also for money. As the platform has grown significantly over the past few years, it has allowed companies to advertise and rapidly reach their intended demographic through influencer marketing. The platform's AI algorithm also contributes to the influencer marketing potential, as it picks out content according to the user's preference. Sponsored content is not as prevalent on the platform as it is on other social media apps, but brands and influencers still can make as much as they would if not more in comparison to other platforms. Influencers on the platform who earn money through engagement, such as likes and comments, are referred to as "meme machines."

In 2021, The New York Times reported that viral TikTok videos by young people relating the emotional impact of books on them, tagged with the label "BookTok," significantly drove sales of literature. Publishers were increasingly using the platform as a venue for influencer marketing.

In 2022, NBC News reported in a television segment that some TikTok and YouTube influencers were being given free and discounted cosmetic surgeries in order for them to advertise the surgeries to users of the platforms.

In 2022 it was reported that a trend called "de-influencing" had become popular on the platform as a backlash to influencer marketing. TikTok creators participating in this trend made videos criticising products promoted by influencers and asked their audiences not to buy products they did not need. However, some creators participating in the trend started promoting alternative products to their audiences and earning commission from sales made through their affiliate links in the same manner as the influencers they were originally criticising.

Use by businesses 
In October 2020, the e-commerce platform Shopify added TikTok to its portfolio of social media platforms, allowing online merchants to sell their products directly to consumers on TikTok.

Some small businesses have used TikTok to advertise and to reach an audience wider than the geographical region they would normally serve. The viral response to many small business TikTok videos has been attributed to TikTok's algorithm, which shows content that viewers at large are drawn to, but which they are unlikely to actively search for (such as videos on unconventional types of businesses, like beekeeping and logging).

In 2020, digital media companies such as Group Nine Media and Global used TikTok increasingly, focusing on tactics such as brokering partnerships with TikTok influencers and developing branded content campaigns. Notable collaborations between larger brands and top TikTok influencers have included Chipotle's partnership with David Dobrik in May 2019 and Dunkin' Donuts' partnership with Charli D'Amelio in September 2020.

Sex work
TikTok is regularly used by sex workers to promote pornographic content sold on platforms such as OnlyFans. In 2020, the use of the term "accountant" to refer to adult content creators became widespread after a user posted a viral song on the platform about how it was easier for him to tell people he was an accountant instead of a pornographic actor. In response, TikTok updated their terms of service to ban content that promotes "premium sexual content" and banned a large number of adult content creators, but these creators have used various methods to evade censorship. Methods used by adult content creators to avoid censorship include referring to themselves as accountants, using substitutes for words in their captions and videos - such as using the corn emoji in place of the word "porn", and "n00ds" instead of "nudes - and using filters to censor their explicit images. Some adult creators have also gone viral for posting videos with unsolvable riddles in them. These riddles attracted large numbers of comments by people trying and failing to solve the riddles, which in turn caused TikTok's recommendation algorithm to recommend them to more people as it perceived them as popular videos.

Collab houses 
Popular TikTok users have lived collectively in collab houses, predominantly in the Los Angeles area.

Bans and attempted bans

Asia
, TikTok is reportedly banned in several Asian countries including Afghanistan, Armenia, Azerbaijan, Bangladesh, India, Iran, Pakistan, and Syria. The app was previously banned temporarily in Indonesia and Jordan, though both have been lifted since.

Canada 
In February 2023, the Canadian government banned TikTok from all government-issued mobile devices.

Europe 
In February 2023, the European Commission and European Council banned TikTok from official devices.

Belgium 
In March 2023, Belgium banned TikTok from all federal government work devices over cybersecurity, privacy, and misinformation concerns.

Denmark 
In March 2023, Denmark's Ministry of Defence banned TikTok on work devices.

United Kingdom 
In March 2023, the UK government announced that TikTok would be banned on electronic devices used by ministers and other employees, amid security concerns relating to the app's handling of user data. The same month, BBC told all employees to delete TikTok off their devices unless the app was being used for work purposes. The network is also reportedly considering a ban on the app.

United States

On 6 August 2020, then U.S. President Donald Trump signed an order which would ban TikTok transactions in 45 days if it was not sold by ByteDance. Trump also signed a similar order against the WeChat application owned by the Chinese multinational company Tencent.

On 14 August 2020, Trump issued another order giving ByteDance 90 days to sell or spin off its U.S. TikTok business. In the order, Trump said that there is "credible evidence" that leads him to believe that ByteDance "might take action that threatens to impair the national security of the United States." Donald Trump was concerned about TikTok being a threat because TikTok's parent company was rumored to be taking United States user data and reporting it back to Chinese operations through the company ByteDance.

In June 2021, new president Joe Biden signed an executive order revoking the Trump administration ban on TikTok, and instead ordered the Secretary of Commerce to investigate the app to determine if it poses a threat to U.S. national security.

In June 2022, reports emerged that ByteDance employees in China could access US data and repeatedly accessed the private information of TikTok users, TikTok employees were cited saying that "everything is seen in China," while one director claimed a Beijing-based engineer referred to as a "Master Admin" has "access to everything."

Following the reports, TikTok announced that 100% of its US user traffic is now being routed to Oracle Cloud, along with their intention to delete all US user data from their own data centers. This deal stems from the talks with Oracle instigated in September 2020 in the midst of Trump's threat to ban TikTok in the US.

In June 2022, FCC Commissioner Brendan Carr called for Google and Apple to remove TikTok from their app stores, citing national security concerns, saying TikTok "harvests swaths of sensitive data that new reports show are being accessed in Beijing."

In October 2022, a Forbes report claimed that the ByteDance team planned to surveil individual American citizens for undisclosed reasons. TikTok denied these claims in a series of tweets, saying that this report lacked "both rigor and journalistic integrity."

In November 2022, Christopher A. Wray, director of the Federal Bureau of Investigation, told U.S. lawmakers that "the Chinese government could use [TikTok] to control data collection on millions of users or control the recommendation algorithm, which could be used for influence operations."

In December 2022, Senator Marco Rubio and representatives Mike Gallagher and Raja Krishnamoorthi introduced the Averting the National Threat of Internet Surveillance, Oppressive Censorship and Influence, and Algorithmic Learning by the Chinese Communist Party Act (ANTI-SOCIAL CCP Act), which would prohibit Chinese- and Russian-owned social networks from doing business in the United States. That month, Senator Josh Hawley also introduced a separate measure, the No TikTok on Government Devices Act, to ban federal employees from using TikTok on all government devices. On December 15, Hawley's measure was unanimously passed by the U.S. Senate. On December 27, the Chief Administrative Officer of the United States House of Representatives banned TikTok from all devices managed by the House of Representatives.

As of February 2023, at least 32 (of 50) states have announced or enacted bans on state government agencies, employees, and contractors using TikTok on government-issued devices. State bans only affect government employees and do not prohibit civilians from having or using the app on their personal devices.

In March 2023, Politico reported that TikTok hired SKDK to lobby amid a possible federal ban.

Oceania
By 7 March 2023, 68 Australian federal agencies had banned TikTok on work-related mobile devices. Liberal Party Senator James Paterson called for a federal ban on all government-related devices.

On 17 March 2023, the New Zealand Parliamentary Service banned TikTok on devices connected to Parliament, citing cybersecurity concerns.

Controversies

Addiction concerns 
There are concerns that some users may find it hard to stop using TikTok. In April 2018, an addiction-reduction feature was added to Douyin. This encouraged users to take a break every 90 minutes. Later in 2018, the feature was rolled out to the TikTok app. TikTok uses some top influencers such as Gabe Erwin, Alan Chikin Chow, James Henry, and Cosette Rinab to encourage viewers to stop using the app and take a break.

Many were also concerned with the app affecting users' attention spans due to the short-form nature of the content. This is a concern as many of TikTok's audience are younger children, whose brains are still developing. TikTok executives and representatives have noted and made aware to advertisers on the platform that users have poor attention spans. With a large amount of video content, nearly 50% of users find it stressful to watch a video longer than a minute and a third of users watch videos at double speed. TikTok has also received criticism for enabling children to purchase coins which they can send to other users.

In June 2022, TikTok introduced the ability to set a maximum uninterrupted screen time allowance, after which the app blocks off the ability to navigate the feed. The block only lifts after the app is exited and left unused for a set period of time. Additionally, the app features a dashboard with statistics on how often the app is opened, how much time is spent browsing it and when the browsing occurs.

Content concerns 
Some countries have shown concerns regarding the content on TikTok, as their cultures view it as obscene, immoral, vulgar, and encouraging pornography. There have been temporary blocks and warnings issued by countries including Indonesia, Bangladesh, India, and Pakistan over the content concerns. In 2018, Douyin was reprimanded by Chinese media watchdogs for showing "unacceptable" content.

On 27 July 2020, Egypt sentenced five women to two years in prison over TikTok videos. One of the women had encouraged other women to try and earn money on the platform, another woman was sent to prison for dancing. The court also imposed a fine of 300,000 Egyptian pounds (UK£14,600) on each defendant.

With reports that Palestinians resorted to TikTok for promoting their cause after social media platforms like Facebook and Twitter blocked their content, Israeli analyst Yoni Ben-Menachem told Arab News in 2022 that the Chinese app was a “tool of dangerous influence” inciting violence through videos glorifying attacks against Israelis. The Palestinian militant group Lion's Den gained much of their popularity through TikTok, according to Ynet. On February 2023, Otzma Yehudit politician Almog Cohen advocated blocking TikTok for all of East Jerusalem.

Concerns have been voiced regarding content relating to, and the promotion and spreading of, hateful words and far-right extremism, such as anti-semitism, racism, and xenophobia. Some videos were shown to expressly deny the existence of the Holocaust and told viewers to take up arms and fight in the name of white supremacy and the swastika. As TikTok has gained popularity among young children, and the popularity of extremist and hateful content is growing, calls for tighter restrictions on their flexible boundaries have been made. TikTok has since released tougher parental controls to filter out inappropriate content and to ensure they can provide sufficient protection and security.

A viral TikTok trend known as "devious licks" involves students vandalizing or stealing school property and posting videos of the action on the platform. The trend has led to increasing school vandalism and subsequent measures taken by some schools to prevent damage. Some students have been arrested for participating in the trend. TikTok has taken measures to remove and prevent access to content displaying the trend.

The Wall Street Journal has reported that doctors experienced a surge in reported cases of tics, tied to an increasing number of TikTok videos from content creators with Tourette syndrome. Doctors suggested that the cause may be a social one as users who consumed content showcasing various tics would sometimes develop tics of their own.

In March 2022, the Washington Post reported that Facebook owner Meta Platforms had paid Targeted Victory—a consulting firm backed by supporters of the U.S. Republican Party—to coordinate lobbying and media campaigns against TikTok to portray it as "a danger to American children and society", primarily to stoke anti-Chinese xenophobia and counter criticism of Facebook's own services. This included op-eds and letters to the editor in regional publications, the amplification of "dubious local news stories citing TikTok as the origin of dangerous teen trends" (such as the aforementioned "devious licks", and an alleged "Slap a Teacher" challenge), including those whose initial development actually began on Facebook, and the similar promotion of "proactive coverage" of Facebook corporate initiatives.

In Malaysia, TikTok is used by some users to engage in hate speech against race and religion especially mentioning the 13 May incident after the 2022 election. TikTok responded by taking down videos with content that violated their community guidelines.

Indiana Attorney General Todd Rokita filed lawsuits against TikTok, alleging that the platform exposed inappropriate content to minors. The complaint also alleges that TikTok "intentionally falsely reports the frequency of sexual content, nudity, and mature/suggestive themes" on their platform which made the app's "12-plus" age ratings on the Apple and Google app stores deceptive.

TikTok raised the minimum age for livestreaming from 16 to 18 after a BBC News investigation found hundreds of accounts going live from Syrian refugee camps, with children begging for donations through digital gifts, which lead to TikTok taking a 70% cut of the donations.

Appropriation from Black content creators 
Numerous examples of White TikTokers appropriating what was initially created by Black TikTokers have been noted on the platform. In June 2021, The New York Times published an investigation into the practice as part of the Hulu documentary, Who Gets to be an Influencer? In July 2021, after Megan Thee Stallion released her song "Thot Shit," Black content creators refused to make dances to it as they normally would, in protest of the inequity to Black creators due to White TikTokers mimicking them.

Misinformation 

In January 2020, left-leaning media watchdog Media Matters for America said that TikTok hosted misinformation related to the COVID-19 pandemic despite a recent policy against misinformation. In April 2020, the government of India asked TikTok to remove users posting misinformation related to the COVID-19 pandemic. There were also multiple conspiracy theories that the government is involved with the spread of the pandemic. As a response to this, TikTok launched a feature to report content for misinformation. It reported that in the second half of 2020, over 340,000 videos in the U.S. about election misinformation and 50,000 videos of COVID-19 misinformation were removed.

To combat misinformation in the 2022 midterm election in the US, TikTok announced a midterms Elections Center available in-app to users in 40 different languages. TikTok partnered with the National Association of Secretaries of State to give accurate local information to users.

In September 2022, NewsGuard Technologies reported that among the TikTok searches it had conducted and analyzed from the U.S., 19.4% surfaced misinformation such as questionable or harmful content about COVID-19 vaccines, homemade remedies, the 2020 US elections, the war in Ukraine, the Robb Elementary School shooting, and abortion. NewsGuard suggested that in contrast, results from Google were of higher quality. Mashable's own test from Australia found innocuous results after searching for "getting my COVID vaccine" but suggestions such as "climate change is a myth" after typing in "climate change".

Content censorship and moderation by the platform 

TikTok's censorship policy has been criticized as non-transparent. Criticism of leaders such as Xi Jinping, Vladimir Putin, Donald Trump, Barack Obama, Mahatma Gandhi and Recep Tayyip Erdoğan has been suppressed by the platform, as well as information relating to the Xinjiang internment camps and the Uyghur genocide. Internal documents have revealed that moderators suppress posts created by users deemed "too ugly, poor, or disabled" for the platform, and censor political speech on livestreams. TikTok moderators have also blocked content that could be perceived as positive towards LGBT people in addition to a set of country-specific censorship rules such as banning mentions of 1989 Tiananmen Square protests and massacre in China and Kurdish nationalism in Turkey.

In 2022, in response to criticism, the platform launched a "transparency center" – a virtual hub where researchers can access the platform's moderation tools and content guidelines, including a secret list of keywords used for filtering content.

2022 Russian invasion of Ukraine 
TikTok is the 10th most popular app in Russia. After a new set of Russian fake news laws was installed in March 2022, the company announced a series of restrictions on Russian and non-Russian posts and livestreams. Tracking Exposed, a user data rights group, learned of what was likely a technical glitch that became exploited by pro-Russia posters. It stated that although this and other loopholes were patched by TikTok before the end of March, the initial failure to correctly implement the restrictions, in addition to the effects from Kremlin's "fake news" laws, contributed to the formation of a "splinternet ... dominated by pro-war content" in Russia. TikTok said that it had removed 204 accounts for swaying public opinion about the war while obscuring their origins and that its fact checkers had removed 41,191 videos for violating its misinformation policies.

ISIL propaganda 

In October 2019, TikTok removed about two dozen accounts that were responsible for posting ISIL propaganda and execution videos on the app.

User privacy concerns 
Privacy concerns have also been brought up regarding the app. In its privacy policy, TikTok lists that it collects usage information, IP addresses, a user's mobile carrier, unique device identifiers, keystroke patterns, and location data, among other data. Web developers Talal Haj Bakry and Tommy Mysk said that allowing videos and other content to be shared by the app's users through HTTP puts the users' data privacy at risk.

Since the early 2020s, American conservatives have accused the website of spying on its users in cooperation with the Chinese government. These accusations and conspiracy theories were created in part by Republican consulting firms such as Targeted Victory as well as Facebook parent Meta.

In January 2020, Check Point Research discovered a security flaw in TikTok which could have allowed hackers access to user accounts using SMS. In February, Reddit CEO Steve Huffman criticised the app, calling it "spyware," and stating "I look at that app as so fundamentally parasitic, that it's always listening, the fingerprinting technology they use is truly terrifying, and I could not bring myself to install an app like that on my phone." Responding to Huffman's comments, TikTok stated, "These are baseless accusations made without a shred of evidence." Wells Fargo banned the app from its devices due to privacy and security concerns.
In May 2020, the Dutch Data Protection Authority announced an investigation into TikTok in relation to privacy protections for children. In June 2020, the European Data Protection Board announced that it would assemble a task force to examine TikTok's user privacy and security practices.

In August 2020, The Wall Street Journal reported that TikTok tracked Android user data, including MAC addresses and IMEIs, with a tactic in violation of Google's policies. The report sparked calls in the U.S. Senate for the Federal Trade Commission (FTC) to launch an investigation.

In June 2021, TikTok updated its privacy policy to include a collection of biometric data, including "faceprints and voiceprints." Some experts reacted by calling the terms of collection and data use "vague" and "highly problematic." The same month, CNBC reported that former employees had stated that "the boundaries between TikTok and ByteDance were so blurry as to be almost non-existent" and that "ByteDance employees are able to access U.S. user data" on TikTok.

In October 2021, following the Facebook Files and controversies about social media ethics, a bipartisan group of lawmakers also pressed TikTok, YouTube, and Snapchat on questions of data privacy and moderation for age-appropriate content. The New York Times reported, "Lawmakers also hammered [head of U.S. policy at TikTok] Mr. Beckerman about whether TikTok’s Chinese ownership could expose consumer data to Beijing," stating that "Critics have long argued that the company would be obligated to turn Americans’ data over to the Chinese government if asked." TikTok told U.S. lawmakers it does not give information to China's government. TikTok's representative stated that TikTok's data is stored in the U.S. with backups in Singapore. According to the company's representative, TikTok had "no affiliation" with the subsidiary Beijing ByteDance Technology, in which the Chinese government has a minority stake and board seat.

In June 2022, BuzzFeed News reported that leaked audio recordings of internal TikTok meetings revealed that certain China-based employees of the company maintain full access to overseas data.

In August 2022, software engineer and security researcher Felix Krause found that TikTok's in-app browser contained keylogger functionality.

In September 2022, during testimony to the Senate Homeland Security Committee, TikTok's COO stated that the company could not commit to stopping data transfers from US users to China. The COO reacted to concerns of the company's handling of user data by stating that TikTok does not operate in China, though the company does have an office there.

Additionally, in November 2022, TikTok's head of privacy for Europe, Elaine Fox, confirmed that some of its workers, including the workers in China, have access to the user info of accounts from the UK and European Union. According to Fox, this "privacy policy" was "based on a demonstrated need to do their job."

In March 2023, a former employee of the company held multiple meetings with US senators, stating that the company's proposed Project Texas data protections would not prevent Chinese employees of TikTok from "spying" on US users' data. The ex-employee also stated that a complete "re-engineering" of the app would be required to achieve privacy from China.

U.S. COPPA fines 

On 27 February 2019, the United States Federal Trade Commission (FTC) fined ByteDance U.S.$5.7 million for collecting information from minors under the age of 13 in violation of the Children's Online Privacy Protection Act. ByteDance responded by adding a kids-only mode to TikTok which blocks the upload of videos, the building of user profiles, direct messaging, and commenting on others' videos, while still allowing the viewing and recording of content. In May 2020, an advocacy group filed a complaint with the FTC saying that TikTok had violated the terms of the February 2019 consent decree, which sparked subsequent Congressional calls for a renewed FTC investigation. In July 2020, it was reported that the FTC and the United States Department of Justice had initiated investigations.

UK Information Commissioner's Office investigation 
In February 2019, the United Kingdom's Information Commissioner's Office launched an investigation of TikTok following the fine ByteDance received from the United States Federal Trade Commission (FTC). Speaking to a parliamentary committee, Information Commissioner Elizabeth Denham said that the investigation focuses on the issues of private data collection, the kind of videos collected and shared by children online, as well as the platform's open messaging system which allows any adult to message any child. She noted that the company was potentially violating the General Data Protection Regulation (GDPR) which requires the company to provide different services and different protections for children.

Italian Data Protection Authority 
On 22 January 2021, the Italian Data Protection Authority ordered the blocking of the use of the data of users whose age has not been established on the social network. The order was issued after the death of a 10-year-old Sicilian girl, which occurred after the execution of a challenge shared by users of the platform that involved attempting to choke the user with a belt around the neck. The block is set to remain in place until 15 February, when it will be re-evaluated.

Ireland Data Protection Commission 
In September 2021, the Ireland Data Protection Commissioner opened investigations into TikTok concerning the protection of minors' data and transfers of personal data to China.

Texas Attorney General investigation 
In February 2022, the incumbent Texas Attorney General, Ken Paxton, initiated an investigation into TikTok for alleged violations of children's privacy and facilitation of human trafficking. Paxton claimed that the Texas Department of Public Safety gathered several pieces of content showing the attempted recruitment of teenagers to smuggle people or goods across the Mexico–United States border. He claimed the evidence may prove the company's involvement in "human smuggling, sex trafficking and drug trafficking." The company claimed that no illegal activity of any kind is supported on the platform.

Journalist spying scandal 

In December 2022, TikTok confirmed that journalists’ data was accessed by employees of its parent company. It previously denied using location information to track U.S. users.

TikTok parent company ByteDance fired four employees who improperly accessed the personal data of two journalists on the platform, a TikTok spokesman ByteDance confirmed to CNN. As ByteDance employees investigated potential employee leaks to the media, they accessed the TikTok user data of two journalists, according to the company. Personal data obtained from journalists' accounts included IP addresses, which can be used to track location.

The incident is reportedly being investigated by the FBI as of March 2023.

Privacy Commissioner of Canada investigation 
In February 2023, the Privacy Commissioner of Canada, along with its counterparts in Alberta, British Columbia, and Quebec, launched an investigation into TikTok's data collection practices.

Cyberbullying 
As with other platforms, journalists in several countries have raised privacy concerns about the app because it is popular with children and has the potential to be used by sexual predators.

Several users have reported endemic cyberbullying on TikTok, including racism and ableism. In December 2019, following a report by German digital rights group Netzpolitik.org, TikTok admitted that it had suppressed videos by disabled users as well as LGBTQ+ users in a purported effort to limit cyberbullying. TikTok's moderators were also told to suppress users with "abnormal body shape," "ugly facial looks," "too many wrinkles," or in "slums, rural fields" and "dilapidated housing" to prevent bullying.

In 2021, the platform revealed that it will be introducing a feature that will prevent teenagers from receiving notifications past their bedtime. The company will no longer send push notifications after 9 PM to users aged between 13 and 15. For 16 to 17 year olds, notifications will not be sent after 10 PM.

Impact on mental health
In February 2022, The Wall Street Journal reported that "Mental-health professionals around the country are growing increasingly concerned about the effects on teen girls of posting sexualized TikTok videos." In March 2022, a coalition of U.S. state attorneys general launched an investigation into TikTok's effect on children's mental health.

Medication shortages

In November 2022, Australia's medical regulatory agency, the Therapeutic Goods Administration (TGA) reported that there was a global shortage of the diabetes medication Ozempic. Ozempic is a brand of semaglutide used by patients with Type-2 diabetes to regulate blood glucose, with weight loss as side effect. According to the TGA, the rise in demand was caused by an increase in off-label prescription of the drug for weight loss purposes. Off-label prescription is the prescription of a drug for purposes other than what it was approved for. In December 2022, after the United States Food and Drug Administration (FDA) listed Ozempic as being in shortage in the United States as well, it was reported that huge increase in demand for off-label prescriptions of the medicine was caused by a weight loss trend on TikTok, where videos about the drug had exceeded 360 million views. Wegovy, a drug with a higher dosage of semaglutide that has been specifically approved for use in treating obesity, also became popular on the platform after Elon Musk credited it for helping him lose weight.

Workplace conditions 
Several former employees of the company have claimed of poor workplace conditions, including the start of the workweek on Sunday to cooperate with Chinese timezones and excessive workload. Employees claimed they averaged 85 hours of meetings per week and would frequently stay up all night in order to complete tasks. Some employees claimed the workplace's schedule operated similarly to the 996 schedule. The company has a stated policy of working from 10 AM to 7 PM five days per week (63 hours per week), but employees noted that it was encouraged for employees to work after hours. One female worker complained that the company did not allow her adequate time to change her feminine hygiene product because of back-to-back meetings. Another employee noted that working at the company caused her to seek marriage therapy and lose an unhealthy amount of weight. In response to the allegations, the company noted that they were committed to allowing employees "support and flexibility."

Algorithm difference 
Users and content creators around the world have noticed significant differences between the Global version of TikTok and its Chinese counterpart. Most notably, the Chinese version Douyin pushes inspiring contents such as achievements, special talents, etc., to its users while the global version generally pushes more impractical and unsuitable contents and trends to its global users.

Legal issues

Tencent lawsuits
Tencent's WeChat platform has been accused of blocking Douyin's videos. In April 2018, Douyin sued Tencent and accused it of spreading false and damaging information on its WeChat platform, demanding CN¥1 million in compensation and an apology. In June 2018, Tencent filed a lawsuit against Toutiao and Douyin in a Beijing court, alleging they had repeatedly defamed Tencent with negative news and damaged its reputation, seeking a nominal sum of CN¥1 in compensation and a public apology. In response, Toutiao filed a complaint the following day against Tencent for allegedly unfair competition and asking for CN¥90 million in economic losses.

Data transfer class action lawsuit 
In November 2019, a class action lawsuit was filed in California that alleged that TikTok transferred personally identifiable information of U.S. persons to servers located in China owned by Tencent and Alibaba. The lawsuit also accused ByteDance, TikTok's parent company, of taking user content without their permission. The plaintiff of the lawsuit, college student Misty Hong, downloaded the app but said she never created an account. She realized a few months later that TikTok has created an account for her using her information (such as biometrics) and made a summary of her information. The lawsuit also alleged that information was sent to Chinese tech giant Baidu. In July 2020, twenty lawsuits against TikTok were merged into a single class action lawsuit in the United States District Court for the Northern District of Illinois. In February 2021, TikTok agreed to pay $92 million to settle the class action lawsuit.

Voice actor lawsuit 
In May 2021, Canadian voice actor Bev Standing filed a lawsuit against TikTok over the use of her voice in the text-to-speech feature without her permission. The lawsuit was filed in the Southern District of New York. TikTok declined to comment. Standing believes that TikTok used recordings she made for the Chinese government-run Institute of Acoustics. The voice used in the feature was subsequently changed.

Market Information Research Foundation lawsuit 
In June 2021, the Netherlands-based Market Information Research Foundation (SOMI) filed a €1.4 billion lawsuit on behalf of Dutch parents against TikTok, alleging that the app gathers data on children without adequate permission.

Blackout Challenge lawsuits 
Multiple lawsuits have been filed against TikTok, accusing the platform of hosting content that led to the death of at least seven children. The lawsuits claim that children died after attempting the "Blackout challenge", a TikTok trend that involves strangling or asphyxiating someone or themselves until they black out (passing out). TikTok stated that search queries for the challenge do not show any results, linking instead to protective resources, while the parents of two of the deceased argued that the content showed up on their children's TikTok feeds, without them searching for it.

See also
 List of most-followed TikTok accounts
 List of most-liked TikTok videos
 Musical.ly
 Timeline of social media

References

External links

 Official website 
 Douyin 

 
2016 software
2010s fads and trends
2020s fads and trends
Internet properties established in 2016
2016 establishments in China
Chinese companies established in 2016
Android (operating system) software
ByteDance
Chinese brands
Freeware
Internet culture
IOS software
Mobile applications
Music software
Social networking services
Video hosting
Video software
Youth culture
Delisted applications
Social media companies
Chinese social networking websites